The Kashmir markhor, Pir Panjal markhor, or flare-horned markhor (Capra falconeri cashmiriensis) is a possible subspecies of Capra falconeri endemic to the Western Himalayas of India and Pakistan. Many, including the IUCN, do not consider it a separate subspecies.

These markhors are hunted as part of a community-based hunting program. In the past, according to a survey conducted by CITES and the WWF with help from the KPK wildlife department, only 300 Markhors were counted. Then government started the community-based hunting program and issued 4 hunting permits per year. It also required that 80% of the revenue collected through trophy hunting be donated to the local community, which encouraged locals to stop poaching it as a source of food. This hunting program succeeded and a more recent survey counted 4000 markhors.

This animal is easier to hunt than the Astor markhor or Suleman markhor but the hunter must be in good physical condition. A 40 inch horn is considered representable.

Appearance
This wild goat-antelope's horns curve in a spiral pattern, unlike those of the Astor markhor, whose horns are large and flat horns, branching widely and then going up nearly straight with only a half turn, from a heavy, flat horns, twisted like a corkscrew.

Habitat
These animals live in dry places.  In the winter, they do not live more than 2200 meters above sea level.

Behavior
For most of the year, the Kashmir markhor eats grassy plants.  In the winter, when snow covers the grass, the Kashmir markhor will eat parts of trees and shrubs if it cannot find grass.  It can eat pine needles, but not when it can find other foods. The Astor markhor also has a tendency to sexually segregate outside the mating season. The females are usually confined to cliffs with less forage coverage, while the males live in areas with a lot more forage coverage.

Threats
There are few Kashmir markhor left because human beings take livestock to graze in its preferred habitats.  Others have killed the Kashmir markhor for its horns.

In culture
The nominate subspecies Kashmir markhor is the State animal of Azad Kashmir.

Notes

References

Capra (genus)
Mammals of Pakistan
Azad Kashmir